The Harold Masursky Award for Meritorious Service to Planetary Science, usually called the Masursky Award, is awarded annually by the Division for Planetary Sciences (DPS) of the American Astronomical Society. The award for Meritorious Service to Planetary Science was established by the DPS to recognize and honor individuals who have rendered outstanding service to planetary science and exploration through engineering, managerial, programmatic, or public service activities.  For purposes of this award, planetary science and exploration refers to the multidisciplinary study of the solar system and its members, excluding work dealing primarily with the Sun or the Earth. It was named in honor of Harold Masursky. The award has been given annually since 1991, except 2001, 2002, and 2009.

Recipients 
Source: American Astronomical Society

See also

 List of astronomy awards

References

External links 
 AAS website about the awards
 The Harold Masursky Award for Meritorious Service to Planetary Science

Masursky Award
American awards
Awards established in 1991
1991 establishments in the United States
American Astronomical Society